This article contains the results of the 2020 Democratic Party presidential primaries and caucuses, the processes by which the Democratic Party selected delegates to attend the 2020 Democratic National Convention from August 17–20, 2020. The series of primaries, caucuses, and state conventions culminated in the national convention, where the delegates cast their votes to formally select a candidate. A simple majority (1,990) of the total delegate votes (3,979) was required to become the nominee.

The campaign for the 2020 Democratic presidential nomination began on July 28, 2017, when Maryland Congressman John Delaney became the first candidate to announce his run for president. By April 2019, more than 20 major candidates were recognized by national and state polls, causing the field of 2020 major Democratic presidential candidates to exceed the field of major candidates in the 2016 Republican Party presidential primaries as the largest presidential candidate field for any single U.S. political party in a single election cycle. With the addition of Michael Bloomberg on November 24, 2019, the number of major Democratic presidential candidates in the 2020 Democratic primaries totaled 29.

When voting began in the 2020 Iowa caucuses, 11 major candidates were actively campaigning. Democratic primaries and caucuses in early states yielded a controversial and disputed victory for Pete Buttigieg in the Iowa caucuses, a narrow victory for Bernie Sanders in the New Hampshire primary over Buttigieg, a victory for Sanders in the Nevada caucuses, and a victory for Joe Biden in the South Carolina primary. Sanders won the popular vote in both Iowa and New Hampshire, with New Hampshire generally considered a win for Sanders. Before the March 3, 2020, Super Tuesday primaries, six major candidates ended their campaigns; Bloomberg and Elizabeth Warren ended their campaigns due to poor showings on Super Tuesday. Tulsi Gabbard ended her campaign on March 19. Sanders ended his campaign on April 8, leaving Biden as the only major candidate. Biden won a majority of delegates on June 2 and was formally nominated on August 20, 2020.

Overview of results

Major candidates
The table below shows candidates who dropped out of the race during the primaries and placed third or better in a state contest or earned at least one national delegate.

Other candidates
Eighteen candidates suspended their campaigns before the Iowa caucuses. Seven major candidates had withdrawn from the race after states began to certify candidates for ballot spots: Joe Sestak, Steve Bullock, Kamala Harris, Julián Castro, Marianne Williamson, Cory Booker, and John Delaney. Three others dropped out after the New Hampshire primary. Since the beginning of the primary season, none of these other candidates have been awarded any delegates.

Other candidates were able to make it on the ballot in individual states. Some votes for minor candidates are unavailable because in many states (territories) they can be listed as Others or Write-ins. Since the beginning of the primary season, none of these other candidates have been awarded any delegates. Of the over 200 people who have filed with the FEC as candidates for the Democratic nomination, the following have been placed on the ballot in at least one state.

†Sometimes listed as "None of the Above"

‡Some states don't count some write-ins or minor candidates individually but lump them together.

Results

Early states

Iowa
The Iowa Democratic caucuses took place on February 3, 2020. The results of the 2020 Iowa caucuses had been challenged by Bernie Sanders before the Democratic National Committee's Rules and Bylaws Committee following certification, as of February 29, 2020. However, no news reports about the outcome of that challenge had occurred afterwards.

New Hampshire
The New Hampshire Democratic primary took place on February 11, 2020.

Nevada
The Nevada Democratic caucus took place with early voting February 14 to 18, and was completed on February 22, 2020.

South Carolina
The South Carolina Democratic primary took place on February 29, 2020, three days prior to Super Tuesday.

Super Tuesday
Super Tuesday took place on March 3, 2020.  A total of 14 states and American Samoa voted on Super Tuesday, including the two biggest states, California and Texas.  Biden gained 726 delegates, Sanders 505, Bloomberg 49, Warren 62, and Tulsi Gabbard 2.

Alabama

American Samoa

Arkansas

California

Colorado

Maine

Massachusetts

Minnesota

North Carolina

Oklahoma

Tennessee

Texas

Utah

Vermont

Virginia

Mid/Late-March

Democrats Abroad

Idaho

Michigan

Mississippi

Missouri

North Dakota

Washington

Northern Mariana Islands

Arizona

Florida

Illinois

April–May

Wisconsin

Alaska

Wyoming

Ohio

Kansas

Nebraska

Oregon

Hawaii

Early June

District of Columbia

Indiana

Maryland

Montana

New Mexico

Pennsylvania

Rhode Island

South Dakota

Mid/Late June

Guam

US Virgin Islands

Georgia

West Virginia

Kentucky

New York

July–August

Delaware

New Jersey

Louisiana

Puerto Rico

Connecticut

Notes

References

2020 United States Democratic presidential primaries